Coby Scott Bell (born May 11, 1975) is an American actor. He is best known for his roles as Jesse Porter on the USA Network original series Burn Notice and professional football player Jason Pitts on The CW/BET comedy-drama The Game. He also co-starred as police officer Tyrone "Ty" Davis, Jr. on the NBC drama Third Watch and as Aaron in the Amazon original series Mad Dogs. He started on Sister Sister from 1994-1999, then starred in other shows & films.

Early life and career
Bell was born in Orange County, California to a white mother and an African-American father, the Broadway actor Michel Bell. Before he began acting, Bell attended San Jose State University, where he graduated with honors. He began his career with a few minor roles in various shows including The Parent 'Hood, Buffy the Vampire Slayer, ER and Smart Guy, before landing a thirteen episode stint as Patrick Owen in L.A. Doctors.

In 1999, Bell landed the role of Officer Ty Davis, Jr. on the NBC drama Third Watch. He was one of only five original cast members to remain on the show throughout its entire six-season run on NBC. During the series' run, he co-starred in Safe, a critically acclaimed play co-written by Third Watch co-star Anthony Ruivivar. The play co-starred Third Watch actors Jason Wiles and Yvonne Jung. He appeared in a Third Watch edition of the American version of The Weakest Link.

In 2005, just months after Third Watch ended its run, Bell landed a recurring role on the UPN comedy series Half & Half as Glen Stallworth, a San Francisco firefighter who is originally set up on a date with main character Mona, but winds up falling for her mother, Phyllis (played by actress Telma Hopkins). Despite appearing in only three episodes, Bell's character was mentioned and referenced throughout the show's fourth and final season. 

In 2006, Bell starred in and co-produced an independent film called Drifting Elegant.  The project marked his debut as a producer. That same year, Bell guest-starred in an episode of the UPN comedy series Girlfriends in an episode entitled "The Game", which served as the pilot episode for the CW comedy-drama series of the same name. Bell stars as Jason Pitts, the captain of the fictional San Diego Sabers football team.  He reprised Jason Pitts in a recurring role when The Game, which was cancelled in 2009, returned on BET in January 2011. In June 2010, Bell joined the cast of the USA Network series Burn Notice as former counter-intelligence agent Jesse Porter.

On February 28, 2020, it was announced that Bell was cast as Captain Larry James, a Texas Ranger Captain, in the CW western crime drama series Walker reboot.

Personal life
Bell is married to Aviss Pinkney-Bell and has four children, three girls and one boy, who are two sets of twins.
In addition to acting, Bell is also a musician and songwriter in a reggae band.  He also serves as a mentor to underprivileged youths in the Big Brothers of America.

Filmography

Movies

Television

References

External links

Coby Bell's biography on filmbug

1975 births
Living people
American male film actors
American male television actors
Male actors from Orange County, California
San Jose State University alumni
20th-century American male actors
21st-century American male actors
African-American male actors
20th-century African-American people
21st-century African-American people